Lidia Nencheva (born in Plovdiv) is a Bulgarian sport shooter.

She has been a competitor for the Bulgarian team since 2010 and has won numerous tournaments on the national level. In August 2014, Nencheva won a gold medal at the mixed team event of the 2014 Summer Youth Olympics.

References

Bulgarian female sport shooters
Sportspeople from Plovdiv
Living people
Shooters at the 2014 Summer Youth Olympics
Year of birth missing (living people)
Youth Olympic gold medalists for Bulgaria
21st-century Bulgarian women